Lake Mountain is a  mountain peak on a plateau that hosts a cross-country ski resort that is known by the same name. The  Mount Bullfight, which is within the Mount Bullfight Nature Conservation Reserve, is the highest peak that can be reached by a cross-country ski trail from Lake Mountain. Access to Lake Mountain's own summit itself is restricted to a snow shoe track in winter. Lake Mountain is the most popular ski resort in Australia when measured in terms of total visitor numbers, including sightseers, due to its proximity to Melbourne.

The Lake Mountain Alpine Resort is surrounded by the Yarra Ranges National Park into which its ski trails lead. The resort is an unincorporated area under the direct administration of the government of Victoria, and is surrounded to the west, north & east by the Shire of Murrindindi and Yarra Ranges Shire to the south. 

There is no lake at Lake Mountain. It is claimed that the mountain was named after George Lake, who was the surveyor-general of the area. Contradicting this, VICNames says that it is named for the "tarns, ponds and bogs near the summit".

Location and features

The Lake Mountain Alpine Resort is situated in a saddle between Lake Mountain and Echo Flat and provides access to a  ski trail network through the surrounding Yarra Ranges National Park. It is an exclusively cross-country skiing resort. It is especially popular with families, with the majority (80%) of the visitors to the resort throughout the year being a family demographic. Many go to the resort not to ski but for sightseeing and snow play; there are up to seven toboggan runs though only the two main runs are open to the general public. The first and most popular is directly adjacent to the Lake Mountain Alpine Resort Day Visitor Centre, while the second branches off of the first for a longer and somewhat steeper slope. Snowboarding is not permitted as is walking on the ski trails.

The alpine centre was opened on 12 June 2004 at a cost of 3.7 million along with the refurbishment and restructuring of two other buildings, a toilet block and visitor's locker room area, and the Ski Patroller's Centre, the main area for the coordination and first aid treatments employed by the Ski Patrollers. It has several other facilities, such as two fully equipped conference centres and a licensed café bar. The Heights Bar and Café remains open all year round, to accommodate bushwalkers and bike riders.

In 2005, the Ski Patroller's Centre was equipped to operate as "Snow Gum Lodge" during the off-season, generally available between November and May, for secluded and private overnight stays. It was the only accommodation on-mountain but was destroyed in the 2009 bushfires.

Impact of 2009 bushfires

The bushfires on 7 February 2009 caused considerable damage at Lake Mountain. Much of the forested area was burnt, and almost all buildings except the main Day Visitor Centre/Ski Hire/Bistro were destroyed. Extensive work was undertaken to enable the resort to open for 2009 winter season. Temporary buildings were delivered to serve as toilets, Ski Patrol and kiosk. Damaged wooden trail features and bridges were rebuilt.

Road cycling
Lake Mountain is a popular destination for road cyclists due to the challenging climbs up to the resort. Lake Mountain can be climbed from two sides: from Warburton (a grueling  climb up the Reefton Spur) or from Marysville, the more popular route. The first  of the climb are the most challenging with an average gradient of 8.1%.

See also

 Alpine National Park
 List of mountains in Victoria
 Marysville
 Mount Torbreck
 Skiing in Australia

References

External links

 Lake Mountain Alpine Resort
 ski.com.au article
 Interactive map

Ski areas and resorts in Victoria (Australia)
Mountains of Victoria (Australia)
Victorian Alps
Towns in Victoria (Australia)
Unincorporated areas of Victoria (Australia)

Forests of Victoria (Australia)